NCSD may refer to:
 National Cyber Security Division
 Nassau County School District - Florida
 Nenana City School District - Nenana, Alaska
 Novi Community School District - Novi, Michigan
 North Carolina School for the Deaf - Morganton, North Carolina